The State Library of Kansas is a department within the state government of Kansas, with locations in Topeka and Emporia. Ray Walling was appointed acting State Librarian in June of 2022.

Locations
The research collections and most of the staff of the State Library of Kansas have been located on the third floor of the Kansas State Capitol at 10th and Jackson Streets in downtown Topeka, Kansas, since 1900.  In December, 2009, the staff was moved out of its third floor location in the State Capitol and into mobile units on the Capitol grounds during renovation of the north wing of the Capitol.  The Library's collections were moved to an Annex in Topeka in April, 2010.  Library staff and collections were returned to the third floor of the Capitol in December, 2012.  The Library's Talking Books Library is located in the lower level of the Student Union, Emporia State University, Emporia, Kansas.

Kansas Center for the Book
The Kansas Center for the Book is a state affiliate of the Center for the Book in the Library of Congress. The Kansas Center for the Book affiliated with the national Center for the Book in 1987, and was hosted and headquartered at the Topeka & Shawnee County Public Library from then until 2005, when it moved to the State Library of Kansas. Programs at the Kansas Center for the Book are: the Kansas Notable Book Awards, Kansas Reads to Preschoolers, and the Parade of States at the National Book Festival.

Kansas Talking Books
The Kansas Talking Book Service, headquartered in Emporia, Kansas, provides books, newspapers and magazines in braille and recorded format with playback equipment to any Kansas citizen unable to use standard print because of visual or physical impairment.  The program is coordinated through the National Library Service for the Blind and Physically Handicapped,  Library of Congress. The Talking Books service also hosts a book club and publishes a regular blog discussing what books are available or popular with the service. In 2022, the program partnered with the Ohio Library for the Blind to expand its collections through the use of the Braille and Audio Reading Download (BARD) service and mobile app. 

The Service heads a network of Kansas Talking Book subregional libraries located in Great Bend, Manhattan, Norton, Wichita and Topeka, Kansas.

Online Services
The Library's online services are available to Kansas residents.  Downloadable audio and e-books are available online through a browser or various apps. The Library provides a Kansas Library eCard, which allows access to these databases:

A list of databases available can be viewed on the State Library's website at kslib.info/eor
Kansas Library eCards are available to Kansas residents and are given out by local public libraries in the state or by visiting the physical location inside the state capitol building
Ebooks and audiobooks through various apps and services, including ComicsPlus, Freading, Enki, and TumbleBooks. 
Online resources for financial and health literacy, automotive repair, career services, research and language learning programs, among many others.

Reference Division
The Research and Information Division serves the research and reference needs of state government and the general public.  The division, located in Topeka, has a collection of over 250,000 titles including books, magazines, current newspapers, U.S. federal documents, Kansas government documents, Kansas legislative material and a newspaper clippings file dating back to the 1920s.  Research assistance is provided for walk-in, telephone, instant message and email questions.  Interlibrary loan service is also available, providing material within the library's collection to people around the world.

The Reference division also offers a Legislative hotline, which has been in operation since 1975. Librarians with the reference division assist Kansans with basic questions about the legislature, including providing bill numbers, status, dates and calendar information. Constituents may also obtain contact information and leave messages for their representatives via this service. Hotline staff are unable to transfer calls to office staff or other numbers. The hotline can be reached at 1-800-432-3924.

References

Further reading
 Gardiner, Allen. The Kansas State Library (1983) http://cdm16884.contentdm.oclc.org/cdm/singleitem/collection/p16884coll1/id/131/rec/5
 Publications of the State Library of Kansas found online http://cdm16884.contentdm.oclc.org/ui/custom/default/collection/default/resources/custompages/agencylist/Agency_Pages/Library.php

External links
 
Online Databases available at the State Library of Kansas
State Library of Kansas publications at KGI Online Library

Education in Shawnee County, Kansas
Education in Topeka, Kansas
Libraries in Kansas
Organizations based in Topeka, Kansas
Library
Kansas
Public libraries in Kansas
1855 establishments in Kansas Territory
Government agencies established in 1855
Libraries established in 1855